Robert Williams (November 5, 1829–August 24, 1901) was an officer in the United States Army who served as Adjutant General of the U.S. Army from 1892 to 1893.

Biography
He was born in Culpeper County, Virginia and graduated from the United States Military Academy in 1851.  He was appointed to the 1st Dragoons, in which he served until the outbreak of the American Civil War.  He served in various staff positions at the beginning of the war, before becoming colonel of 1st Massachusetts Volunteer Cavalry in October 1861.  He resigned his Volunteer commission in October 1862 and became a major in the Adjutant General's Department.

Williams remained in the Adjutant General's Department following the end of the war, and was promoted to lieutenant colonel in February 1869.  He served as adjutant general of the Department of the Missouri, the Department of the Platte, and the Division of the Missouri, earning a promotion to colonel in July 1881.  In December 1890 he returned to the Adjutant General's Department in Washington, and he was elevated to Adjutant General of the U. S. Army with the rank of brigadier general in July 1892.  He retired in November 1893.

He died in August 1901, and is buried in Arlington National Cemetery.

References

External links

1829 births
1901 deaths
Adjutants general of the United States Army
Burials at Arlington National Cemetery
People from Culpeper County, Virginia
People of Virginia in the American Civil War
Union Army colonels
United States Army generals
United States Military Academy alumni